KCXP-LP channel 40 was a low-powered television station in Aspen, Colorado. The station, known on cable as TV Aspen, carried the market's first local TV Newscast and a mixture of local programming like Showcase  Aspen and programs from the Resort Sports Network. TV Aspen could be seen on Comcast channel 19 in the Aspen / Glenwood Springs area. Marcos A. Rodriguez was the founder. See also KUUR and KSNO.

The station's license was cancelled by the Federal Communications Commission on July 19, 2021, due to KCXP-LP not obtaining a license to convert to digital operation prior to the July 13, 2021 deadline.

External links
TV Aspen at aspenglenwood.com

CXP-LP
Television channels and stations established in 1992
1992 establishments in Colorado
Defunct television stations in the United States
Television channels and stations disestablished in 2021
2021 disestablishments in Colorado
CXP-LP